Johann Conrad Schlaun (June 5, 1695 in Nörde now Warburg – October 21, 1773 in Münster) was a German architect. He is an important architect of the Westphalian Baroque architectural style. His designs include the Erbdrostenhof and Schloss, both in Münster.

Life 
Johann Conrad Schlaun was born on June 5, 1695 as the son of Henrich Schluen and his wife Agnes Berendes in Nörde. He was baptized three days later in Ossendorf, Warburg.
Between 1706/7 and fall 1712, he visited the Gymnasium Theodorianum in Paderborn that he left without a degree.
Later, he followed a military career. For the year of 1713 a payment to his father is documented for the purpose of his education in architecture.
On June 22, 1715 he was appointed an artillery lieutenant and engineer of the Prince-Bishopric of Paderborn.
In 1717, he is attested in the Prince-Bishopric of Münster where is appointed a land measurer in 1720.
His first significant work was the Capuchin church in Brakel.

Citations

Literature 
 

1695 births
1773 deaths
German Baroque architects
18th-century German architects
People from Münster